Artigisa melanephele is a moth of the family Erebidae first described by George Hampson in 1914. It is known from Australia and New Zealand.

References

Catocalinae
Moths of Australia
Moths of New Zealand
Moths described in 1914